Cochylimorpha peucedana is a species of moth of the family Tortricidae. It is found in France, Spain and Portugal, as well as on Sicily, Corsica and Sardinia.

The wingspan is 9–19 mm.

The larvae feed on Peucedanum species and Santolina chamaecyparissus. Larvae can be found in May and June.

References

Moths described in 1889
Cochylimorpha
Moths of Europe